Gregory Francis Ball is a professor in the Department of Psychology and Dean of the College of Behavioral and Social Sciences at the University of Maryland, College Park. He is best known for his research into how seasonal hormonal shifts change the brain and reproductive behavior of different bird species.

Education 
Ball received his B.A. in psychology from Columbia University in 1977 and holds a Ph.D. in psychobiology from the Institute of Animal Behavior at Rutgers University (1983). He completed his postdoctoral research in comparative neuroendocrinology and ethology at Rockefeller University.

Research 
Ball's research focuses on the interrelation of hormones, brain, and animal behavior, specifically how hormones and the external environment result in the production of social behaviors and changes to neural biology. The Ball lab works with a variety of avian species that exhibit a high degree of neuroplasticity in response to hormone treatment, which allows for the study both of how hormones modulate learned behaviors and of how behaviors affect endocrine activity, thus leading to changes in social behavior. The author of over 200 scholarly publications, Ball's research continues to be supported by grants from the National Institutes of Health.

Administrative career 
Before becoming Dean of the College of Behavioral and Social Sciences at the University of Maryland in 2014, Ball was the Vice Dean for Science and Research Infrastructure in the Krieger School of Arts and Sciences at Johns Hopkins University, where he was also faculty in the Department of Psychological and Brain Sciences and the director of the undergraduate program in neuroscience, with joint appointments in the Department of Biochemistry and Molecular Biology, Division of Reproductive Biology at the Bloomberg School of Public Health, and in the Department of Neuroscience at the School of Medicine. From 2008 to 2010, Ball served as the Dean of Research and Graduate Education in the JHU School of Arts and Sciences. About the addition of higher education administration to his research portfolio, Ball notes, "Ever since middle school, I’ve wanted to make a living from the life of the mind. At this stage of my career, I’m most interested in shaping an institution of higher learning. I believe that strong universities are an important part of the health and the future of the United States."

Honors and awards 
The JHU Student Council awarded Ball with the George E. Owen Teaching Award for outstanding teaching and devotion to undergraduates, and he received the Alumni Association Teaching Award in observance of his exemplary undergraduate instruction. In 2014, Ball was named a fellow of the American Association for the Advancement of Science.

References

External links
Faculty page

Living people
Columbia College (New York) alumni
21st-century American psychologists
Rutgers University alumni
University of Maryland College of Behavioral and Social Sciences people
University of Maryland, College Park faculty
Johns Hopkins University faculty
Fellows of the American Association for the Advancement of Science
Year of birth missing (living people)
American university and college faculty deans